Maskinongé is a provincial electoral district in the Mauricie region of Quebec which elects members to the National Assembly of Quebec. It notably includes parts of the city of Trois-Rivières, as well as the municipalities of Louiseville, Saint-Boniface, Saint-Étienne-des-Grès and Saint-Alexis-des-Monts.

It was created for the 1867 election, and an electoral district of that name existed even earlier: see Maskinongé (Province of Canada).

In the change from the 2001 to the 2011 electoral map, its border with the Trois-Rivières electoral district was adjusted, resulting in simultaneously gaining and losing different parts of the city of Trois-Rivières.

In the change from the 2011 to the 2017 electoral map, the riding will gain Saint-Boniface and Saint-Mathieu-du-Parc from Saint-Maurice while losing the neighbourhood of Terasse-Duvernay in Trois-Rivières to the riding of Trois-Rivières.

Members of the Legislative Assembly / National Assembly

Election results

|-
 
|Liberal
|Jean-Paul Diamond
|align="right"|11,676
|align="right"|32.06
|align="right"| -10.66

|Émilie Viau-Drouin
|align="right"| 784
|align="right"| 2.15
|align="right"|  
|-

|Middle class
|Linda Delmé
|align="right"|235
|align="right"| 0.65
|align="right"|

|}

^ Change is from redistributed results. CAQ change is from ADQ.

|-
 
|Liberal
|Jean-Paul Diamond
|align="right"|13,429
|align="right"|42.25
|align="right"| +13.24

|Independent
|Michel Thibeault
|align="right"|397
|align="right"|1.25
|align="right"|
|}

|-
 
|Liberal
|Francine Gaudet
|align="right"|10,767
|align="right"|29.01
|align="right"|

|}

See also

Berthier—Maskinongé Federal Electoral District
History of Canada
History of Quebec
Louiseville
District of Maskinongé (Province of Canada)
Mauricie
Politics of Canada
Politics of Quebec

References

External links
Information
 Elections Quebec

Election results
 Election results (National Assembly)

Maps
 2011 map (PDF)
 2001 map (Flash)
2001–2011 changes (Flash)
1992–2001 changes (Flash)
 Electoral map of Mauricie region
 Quebec electoral map, 2011

Louiseville
Politics of Trois-Rivières
Quebec provincial electoral districts